Dalek Dash may refer to:
 Dalek Dash, Isfahan
 Dalek Dash, West Azerbaijan